Satoshi Fujimoto (born 2 August 1975) is a Japanese Paralympic judoka who competes in international level events. He is regarded as one of the most successful Paralympic judoka.

Fujimoto is visually impaired in his left eye due to an accident aged five years old.

References

1975 births
Living people
Paralympic judoka of Japan
Judoka at the 1996 Summer Paralympics
Judoka at the 2000 Summer Paralympics
Judoka at the 2004 Summer Paralympics
Judoka at the 2008 Summer Paralympics
Judoka at the 2016 Summer Paralympics
Medalists at the 1996 Summer Paralympics
Medalists at the 2000 Summer Paralympics
Medalists at the 2004 Summer Paralympics
Medalists at the 2008 Summer Paralympics
Medalists at the 2016 Summer Paralympics
Japanese male judoka